Benny Brown (Benjamin Gene Brown; born September 27, 1953 San Francisco, California – February 1, 1996 Ontario, California) was an Olympic gold-medal winner in the 1976 4x400 Men's Relay running the second leg. He teamed with Herman Frazier, Fred Newhouse and Maxie Parks.

Previously he had finished in 6th place at 440 yards in a very tight finish at the 1971 CIF California State Meet while running for the now closed Sunnyvale High School (California).  Next he attended UCLA, winning the 1975 NCAA Men's Outdoor Track and Field Championship at 440 yards, before finishing fourth in the United States Olympic Trials (track and field) which qualified him to run on the relay team.

In 1979 Brown competed for the Athletes In Action under coach Maxie Parks winning the Meet of Champions.

June 1992 Benny Brown at age 38, competed in the Masters So Cal Track and Field Championship winning the M35 100 & 200 meter dash.

He died in an automobile accident at the age of 42.  He had continued to be an active participant in the U. S. Corporate Games while working for Hughes Aircraft Company.

He was a part-time coach for Cal State Fullerton's track team.

References

External links
 Ben Brown Invitational 1990s to Present
 Ben Brown Invitational Meet Records as of end of 2015
  Daily Bruin, Community mourns loss of former UCLA track star
 LA Times, Feb 1996 Olympian Benny Brown Dies

1953 births
1996 deaths
American male sprinters
Athletes (track and field) at the 1976 Summer Olympics
Olympic gold medalists for the United States in track and field
UCLA Bruins men's track and field athletes
Sportspeople from Sunnyvale, California
American masters athletes
Track and field athletes from San Francisco
Road incident deaths in California
Medalists at the 1976 Summer Olympics